This is a list of events that happened in 2016 in Mexico. The article also lists the most important political leaders during the year at both federal and state levels.

Incumbents

Federal government
 President: Enrique Peña Nieto 

 Interior Secretary (SEGOB): Miguel Ángel Osorio Chong
 Secretary of Foreign Affairs (SRE): Claudia Ruiz Massieu
 Communications Secretary (SCT): Gerardo Ruiz Esparza
 Education Secretary (SEP): Aurelio Nuño Mayer
 Secretary of Defense (SEDENA): Salvador Cienfuegos Zepeda
 Secretary of Navy (SEMAR): Vidal Francisco Soberón Sanz
 Secretary of Labor and Social Welfare (STPS): Alfonso Navarrete Prida 
 Secretary of Welfare (BIENESTAR)
José Antonio Meade, until September 6
Luis Enrique Miranda Nava, starting September 7
 Tourism Secretary (SECTUR): Enrique de la Madrid Cordero
 Secretary of the Environment (SEMARNAT): Rafael Pacchiano Alamán
 Secretary of Health (SALUD)
Mercedes Juan López, until February 8
José Narro Robles, starting February 8
Secretary of Finance and Public Credit, (SHCP)
Luis Videgaray Caso, until September 7
José Antonio Meade, starting September 7

Governors

 Aguascalientes
Carlos Lozano de la Torre , until November 30
Martín Orozco Sandoval , starting December 1.
 Baja California: Francisco Vega de Lamadrid 
 Baja California Sur: Carlos Mendoza Davis 
 Campeche: Alejandro Moreno Cárdenas 
 Chiapas: Manuel Velasco Coello 
 Chihuahua
César Horacio Duarte Jáquez , until October 4
Javier Corral Jurado , starting October 4
 Coahuila: Rubén Moreira Valdez 
 Colima: Mario Anguiano Moreno 
 Durango
Jorge Herrera Caldera , until September 14
José Rosas Aispuro , starting September 15
 Guanajuato: Miguel Márquez Márquez 
 Guerrero: Héctor Astudillo Flores, 
 Hidalgo
Francisco Olvera Ruiz , until September 5
Omar Fayad  starting September 5
 Jalisco: Aristóteles Sandoval  
 Mexico (state): Eruviel Ávila Villegas  
 Michoacán: Silvano Aureoles Conejo 
 Morelos: Graco Ramírez .
 Nayarit: Roberto Sandoval Castañeda 
 Nuevo León: Jaime Rodríguez Calderón ("El Bronco,"), Independent.
 Oaxaca
Gabino Cué Monteagudo  until November 30
Alejandro Murat Hinojosa (PRI), starting December 1.
 Puebla: Rafael Moreno Valle Rosas 
 Querétaro: José Calzada 
 Quintana Roo
Roberto Borge Angulo , until September 25
Carlos Joaquín González , starting September 25.
 San Luis Potosí: Juan Manuel Carreras 
 Sinaloa: Mario López Valdez ("Malova") , until December 31
 Sonora: Claudia Pavlovich Arellano 
 Tabasco: Arturo Núñez Jiménez, 
 Tamaulipas
Egidio Torre Cantú , until October 1
Francisco Javier García Cabeza de Vaca, starting October 1.	
 Tlaxcala: Mariano González Zarur 
 Veracruz
Javier Duarte de Ochoa , until October 12
Flavino Ríos Alvarado, Interim governor October 12 – December 1.
Miguel Ángel Yunes Linares , starting December 1
 Yucatán: Rolando Zapata Bello 
 Zacatecas
Miguel Alonso Reyes , until September 11
Alejandro Tello Cristerna , starting September 12
Head of Government of the Federal District: Miguel Ángel Mancera, Independent

Events

January and February 
January 2 – Gunmen shoot and kill Temixco mayor Gisela Mota Ocampo at her home, the day after she was elected. Police shoot and kill several suspects and arrest several more who are suspected of involvement in organized crime.
January 8 – Mexican police arrest Sinaloa Cartel leader Joaquín Guzmán on January 8. He had been on the run since his second escape from prison in July 2015.
January 20 – The Federal District is dissolved, and it officially becomes the "Ciudad de México". The political reform gives the city self-rule.
January 28 – 2015–2016 Zika virus epidemic: The World Health Organization (WHO) warns that the Zika virus is "spreading explosively" in the Americas.
February 11 – Forty-nine killed and 12 injured during a riot at the Topo Chopo prison in Nuevo León.
 February 12 to 17 – Pope Francis visits Mexico.
February 29 to March 6 – 2016 Monterrey Open

March and April
 April 3, 2016 — Popocatépetl erupted, spewing lava, ash and rock.
April 9 to 15 – 2016 IIHF World Championship Division II Group B in Mexico City
April 14 to 17 – Equestrian jumping show at Campo Marte in Mexico City.
April 16 — Javier Duarte de Ochoa, former Governor of Veracruz (PRI) 2010–2016 is arrested and charged with corruption.
April 20 — At least 24 people were killed, 136 others injured, following a blast at the major Clorados 3 petrochemical plant of Petroquimica Mexicana de Vinilo. The plant is run by Mexichem under agreement with Petroleos Mexicanos (Pemex), the national petrochemical company, in Coatzacoalcos, Veracruz, Mexico, on the country's southern Gulf of Mexico coast. Pemex had an earlier fire at the same facility in February 2016 that killed one worker; also that month, an offshore Pemex Gulf platform fire killed two and injured eight.

May and June
May 17 – President Peña Nieto signs legislation legalizing Same-sex marriage.
June 1 – A riot at the penetentiary Topo Chico in Monterrey, Nuevo León, leaves three inmates killed and 14 injured.
June 3 – Auguste Rodin´s "The Gates of Hell" ( Les Portes de l’Enfer) is displayed at the Museo Soumaya in Mexico City.
June 5 – Elections in 13 states.

July and August
July 17 – Revillagigedo Islands are declared a World Heritage Site by UNESCO.
July 8 – President Peña asks for forgiveness for the "Casa Blanca" scandal that came to light in 2014.
July 23 – Municipal presidents of Chamula, Chiapas, and Pungarabato, Guerro, are assassinated.
 August 2016 – Eruptions continued from Popocateptl, with four discrete blasts on August 17.
August 1 – Municipal president of Huehuetlán el Grande, Puebla, is assassinated.

September and October
September 22 – Eugenio Andrés Lira Rugarcía is named bishop of the Roman Catholic Diocese of Matamoros.
October 4 – The cable line Mexicable opens to facilitate transportation in the Sierra de Guadalupe in Ecatepec de Morelos.
October 12 – Veracruz Governor Javier Duarte de Ochoa is forced to resign after being accused of corruption and illegal enrichment; Flavino Ríos Álvaro become Interim governor.

November and December
November 10: Guillermo Padrés Elías, former Governor of Sonora (PAN) 2009–2015 is arrested for allegedly laundering US$8.9 million.
December 20 – 2016 San Pablito Market fireworks explosion: An explosion at a fireworks factory in Tultepec, State of Mexico, leaves at least 42 people killed and dozens injured.

Awards

Belisario Domínguez Medal of Honor – Gonzalo Rivas (post mortem)
Order of the Aztec Eagle
Frederik, Crown Prince of Denmark
Sabah Al-Ahmad Al-Jaber Al-Sabah, Emir of Kuwait
King Salman of Saudi Arabia
President Mauricio Macri of Argentina
President Sergio Mattarella of Italy
National Prize for Arts and Sciences
National Public Administration Prize
Ohtli Award
Teresa Alonso-Rasgado
 Julian Castro
 L. Whitney Clayton
 Carlos del Rio
Josefina Villamil Tinajero
 Gabriela Teissier

Holidays and observances

January 1 – New Year's Day, statutory holiday
January 6 – Feast of the Epiphany
February 1 – Constitution Day, statutory holiday
February 2 – Feast of Candlemas
February 10 – Ash Wednesday
February 14 – Day of Love and Friendship
February 20 – Mexican Army Day, civic holiday
February 24 – Flag Day, civic holiday
March 8 – International Women's Day
March 18 – Anniversary of the Mexican oil expropriation, civic holiday
March 21 – Benito Juárez's Birthday, statutory holiday
March 19 – March equinox
 March 20 to 26 – Holy Week
March 24 – Holy Thursday
March 25 – Good Friday
April 21 – Heroic Defense of Veracruz, civic holiday
April 30 – Children's Day
May 1 – Labour Day, statutory holiday
May 5 – Cinco de Mayo, civic holiday
May 8 – Miguel Hidalgo y Costilla's Birthday, civic holiday
May 10 – Mother's Day
May 15
Pentecost
Teachers' Day
May 23 – Students' Day
May 26 – Feast of Corpus Christi
June 1 – Mexican Navy Day, civic holiday
June 19 – Father's Day
June 20 – June solstice
September 13 – Anniversary of the "Heroic Cadets", civic holiday
September 15 – Cry of Dolores, civic holiday
September 16 – Independence Day, statutory holiday
September 30 – José María Morelos's Birthday, civic holiday
October 12 – Day of the Race, civic holiday
November 1 – All Saints' Day
November 2 – Day of the Dead
November 20 – Feast of Christ the King
November 21 – Revolution Day, statutory holiday
December 12 – Feast of Our Lady of Guadalupe
 December 16 to 24 – Las Posadas
December 21 – December solstice
December 24 – Christmas Eve
December 25 – Christmas Day, statutory holiday

Deaths
 January 2: Gisela Mota Ocampo, Presidente Municipal of Temixco, Morelos (b. 1982)
 January 7
Joaquín Gamboa Pascoe. Politician and union leader.
Jesús María Ramón Valdés, politician.
January 17: Juan Manuel Ley, businessman (Casa Ley).
January 23: Espectrito, professional wrestler (WWE, AAA).
February 1: Miguel Gutiérrez, soccer player (Club Atlas).
February 12: Braulio Manuel Fernández, 74, politician.
February 13: Rafael Moreno Valle, soldier (general), physician, and politician (PRI), Governor of Puebla (1969–1972), Secretary of Health (1964–1968).
February 15 – Carlos Quintero Arce, 96, Mexican Roman Catholic prelate, Archbishop of Hermosillo (1968–1996).
February 17 – Jesús Barrero, 57, actor and voice actor (Saint Seiya).
February 20 – Moisés Dagdug Lützow, 65, radio-station owner (XEVX-am), politician (PRD), Deputy from Villahermosa, Tabasco (2006–2009) stabbed.
February 21 – María Luisa Alcalá, 72, actress (El Chavo del Ocho, Dr. Cándido Pérez, Esmeralda).
March 14 – Mónica Arriola Gordillo, 44, Mexican politician (New Alliance Party, member of the Chamber of Deputies (2006–2009), cancer.
March 17 – Eliezer Ronen, 84, Mexican-born Israeli politician, member of the Knesset (1974–1977).
March 23 – Fernando Solana, 85, Mexican diplomat and politician, member of the Senate for Mexico City (1994–2000), Secretary of Foreign Affairs (1988–1993), negotiated NAFTA.
 March 26
Raúl Cárdenas, 86, soccer player (Zacatepec) and coach (Cruz Azul, national team).
Francisco García Moreno, a member of the 1968, 1972, and 1976 Olympic water polo teams was shot near his home in Cuernavaca during a robbery.
April 3 – Leopoldo Flores, 82, artist, member of the Salón de la Plástica Mexicana (b. 1934).
April 9 – Lucas Martínez Lara, 70, prelate, Bishop of Roman Catholic Diocese of Matehuala (2006–2016).
April 16 – Rubén Mendoza Ayala, 55, Mexican politician (PRD), Deputy (2003–2006) from the State of Mexico; heart attack.
April 18 – Arnulfo Mejía Rojas, engineer, architect, teacher, historian, painter, artist, and Catholic priest, best known for being the creator of "The Boat of the Faith".
April 24 – Ricardo Torres Origel, 59, Mexican politician (PAN) Deputy (2000–2003) and Senator (2006–2012) from Guanajuato (b. September 8, 1956).
April 26 – Álvaro Pérez Treviño, 85, Mexican politician (Authentic Party of the Mexican Revolution) (b. May 8, 1930).
May 8 – Tonita Castro, 63, Mexican-born American actress (Dads, Funny People, The Book of Life), stomach cancer; (b. January 8, 1953).
May 18 – Luis H. Álvarez, 96, President of National Action Party, Municipal president of Chihuahua (1983–1986) (b. October 25, 1919).
May 22
José Luis Romo Martín, 62, Otomi -Hñäñhü- artist (b. April 19, 1954).
Leonorilda Ochoa, 76, actress (Los Beverly de Peralvillo), Alzheimer's disease (b. October 30, 1937).
June 17 – Rubén Aguirre, 82, actor (Profesor Jirafales in El Chavo del Ocho, El Chapulín Colorado, Chespirito), pneumonia (b. June 15, 1934).
June 20 – Chayito Valdez, 71, Mexican-born American folk singer (Corridos de Caballos) and actress ("Hijos de tigre", "Tierra de Valientes"), complications from a cerebral hemorrhage (b. May 28, 1945).
July 2 – Flavio Romero de Velasco, 90, lawyer and politician (PRI), Governor of Jalisco (1977–1983) (b. February 22, 1925).
July 3 – Mauricio Walerstein, 71, film director (Cuando quiero llorar no lloro, Españolas en París).
 July 6 – Armando León Bejarano, surgeon and Governor of Morelos (PRI), 1976–1982 (b. 1916)
July 7 – Cinna Lomnitz, 90, German-born Chilean-Mexican geophysicist.
 July 17 – Rafael Aguilar Talamantes. Founding politician of the Cardenista Front of National Reconstruction (PFCRN) and Federal Elections of Mexico 1994 presidential candidate in 1994 (b. October 24, 1939).
July 18 – Aldo Monti, 87, actor (Las momias de Guanajuato, Entre el amor y el odio) (b. January 4, 1929).
August 6 – José Becerra, 80, bantamweight boxer, world champion (1959–1960) (b. April 15, 1936).
August 13 – Miguel Bortolini, 74, politician (PRD), President of the Coyoacán (2003—2006); cancer (b. September 29, 1941).
August 20 – Ignacio Padilla, 47, writer, co-founder of the Crack Movement; traffic collision (b. November 7, 1968).
August 23 – Evita Muñoz, 79, Mexican actress (Nosotros los Pobres, Mundo de juguete); pneumonia (b. November 26, 1936).
 August 28 – Juan Gabriel, 56, Singer and composer originally from Michoacán, (b. 1950).
September 16 – Teodoro González de León, 90, Mexican architect (b. May 29, 1926).
October 4 – Mario Almada, 94, Mexican actor (La Viuda Negra).
October 7 – Martha Roth, 84, Italian-born Mexican actress (A Family Like Many Others).
October 9
René Avilés Fabila, 75, author (The Games, Tantadel), heart attack (b. November 15, 1940).
El Mongol, 86, professional wrestler (GCW).
October 10 – Gonzalo Vega, 69, actor (Life Is Most Important, The Place Without Limits) (b. November 29, 1946).
October 24 – Herón Escobar, 62, politician (PT) from Sinaloa, member of Congress (2009–2012).
October 30 – René Velázquez Valenzuela, suspected hitman, leader of the Sinaloa Cartel, shot.
November 5
Israel Cavazos Garza, 93, historian.
Rodolfo Stavenhagen, 84, sociologist.
November 12 – Lupita Tovar, 106, Mexican-American actress (Drácula, Santa, Miguel Strogoff), heart disease.
November 17 – Fidel Negrete, 84, Olympic long-distance runner (1964), Pan American gold medalist (1963).
November 23 – Renato López, 33, actor and television host, shot.

Public holidays

Film
 List of Mexican films of 2016

See also

Timeline of Mexican history
Zika virus outbreak timeline

References

 
2010s in Mexico
Years of the 21st century in Mexico
Mexico